Diffusion is the process by which a new idea or new product is accepted by the market. The rate of diffusion is the speed with which the new idea spreads from one consumer to the next. Adoption (the reciprocal process as viewed from a consumer perspective rather than distributor) is similar to diffusion except that it deals with the psychological processes an individual goes through, rather than an aggregate market process.

Theories
There are several theories that purport to explain the mechanics of diffusion:

The two-step hypothesis – information and acceptance flows, via the media, first to opinion leaders, then to the general population
 The trickle-down effect – products tend to be expensive at first, and therefore only accessible to the wealthy social strata – in time they become less expensive and are diffused to lower and lower strata.
The Everett Rogers Diffusion of innovations theory – for any new idea, concept, product or method, there are five categories of adopters:
Innovators – venturesome, educated, multiple info sources;
Early adopters – social leaders, popular, educated;
Early majority – deliberate, many informal social contacts;
Late majority – skeptical, traditional, lower socio-economic status;
Laggards – neighbors and friends are main info sources, fear of debt.
The Chasm model developed by Lee James and Warren Schirtzinger - Originally named The Marketing Chasm, this model overlays Everett Rogers' adoption curve with a gap between early adopters and the early majority. Chasm theory is only applicable to discontinuous innovations, which are those that impose a change of behavior, new learning, or a new process on the buyer or end user. And the pre-requisite for a chasm or gap to exist in the adoption lifecycle is the innovation must be discontinuous.
Technology driven models – These are particularly relevant to software diffusion. The rate of acceptance of technology is determined by factors such as ease of use and usefulness.

Rate

According to Everett M. Rogers, the rate of diffusion is influenced by:
 The product's perceived advantage or benefit.
 Riskiness of purchase.
 Ease of product use – complexity of the product.
 Immediacy of benefits.
 Observability.
 Trialability.
 Price.
 Extent of behavioral changes required.
 Return on investment in the case of industrial products.

Models
There are several types of diffusion rate models:
Penetration models – use test market data to develop acceptance equations of expected sales volume as a function of time. Three examples of penetration models are:
Bass trial only model
Bass declining trial model
Fourt and Woodlock model
Trial/Repeat models – number of repeat buyers is a function of the number of trial buyers.
Deterministic models – assess number of buyers at various states of acceptance – later states are determined from calculations to previous states.
Stochastic models – recognize that many elements of the diffusion process are unknown but explicitly incorporate probabilistic terms.

See also 
 Bass diffusion model
 Coolhunting
 Diffusion (anthropology)
 Diffusion of innovations
 Early adopter
 Marketing
 Marketing management
 Marketing plan
 New Product Development
 Percolation
 Product life-cycle management
 Technology Adoption Lifecycle
 Technology lifecycle

Footnotes

References
 Bass, F. M. (1969). "A new product growth model for consumer durables". Management Science, 15, 215–227.
 Bass, F. M. (1986). "The adoption of a marketing model: Comments and observations". In V. Mahajan & Y. Wind (Eds.), Innovation Diffusion Models of New Product Acceptance. Cambridge, Massachusetts: Ballinger.
 Moore, Geoffrey. Dealing with Darwin: How Great Companies Innovate at Every Phase of Their Evolution (2005) New York: Penguin.
 Rogers, Everett M. "New Product Adoption and Diffusion". Journal of Consumer Research. Volume 2 (March 1976) pp. 290–301.
 Rogers, Everett M. Diffusion of Innovations, (5th ed.). (2003) New York: Free Press.

Cultural trends
Innovation
Product development
Product management
Technological change

de:Diffusionstheorie